Mahajonpur Union is a union parishad of Mujibnagar Upazila, in Meherpur District, Khulna Division of Bangladesh. There are 6 villages and 5 mouzas in the union.

References

External links
 

Unions of Mujibnagar Upazila
Unions of Meherpur District
Unions of Khulna Division